Jiqeh (also Romanized as Jīqeh; also known as Dzhiga, Jegheh, Jeqeh, Jeqqeh, Jiga, and Jīgheh) is a village in Bedevostan-e Gharbi Rural District, Khvajeh District, Heris County, East Azerbaijan Province, Iran. At the 2006 census, its population was 1,156, in 244 families.

References 

Populated places in Heris County